The Basketball National League (BNL) is the pre-eminent male and female semi-professional basketball league in South Africa. Since its inception in 1993 the league has been exclusively played by male club teams, in 2021 the women's division officially launched. The 11 teams of the WBNL are the female teams of the current participating clubs.

History 
Founded in 1993 as the Premier Basketball League, it was disbanded in 1996. The league was renamed the Basketball National League in 2013. The BNL Season of 2018 started in August, the 3rd and ended on October, the 27th. For the first time ever, the championship was won by the Soweto Panthers.

In 2016 the league piloted a women's division in Gauteng, The Sturdy Stars won the title that year.

South Africa saw the official nationwide launch of the Women's Basketball National League (WBNL) in 2021, with the participating club expansion the W-Tshwane Suns won their first National Championship on the 27 November 2021.

Because of the scarcity of available basketball arenas, all games between 2013 and 2015 were played at Wembley Stadium in Stafford, Gauteng, City of Johannesburg Metropolitan Municipality, a former ice-rink which holds up to 3,000 visitors.

Current clubs 
The league currently has 11 clubs:

Championships

Men

Women

All-Star Team 
The 2018 All-Star Team consisted of:
 Tatenda Maturure (Soweto Panthers)
 Vusimuzi Sithole (Soweto Panthers)
 Reece Prinsloo (Soweto Panthers)
 Marcus Mokoena (Soweto Panthers)
 Kwazi Gumede (eGoli Magic)
 Miguel Ferrao (eGoli Magic)
 Sbusiso Cele (eGoli Magic)
 Kagiso Ngotjana (Tshwane Suns)
 Richard Lubasi (Mpumalanga Rhinos)
 Nkosinathi Sibanyoni (Mpumalanga Rhinos)
 Stenard Mapurisa (Western Cape Mountaineers)
 Nhlanhla Dlamini (KwaZulu Marlins)

Individual wards

See also

 Basketball South Africa

References

External links 
 
 

Basketball competitions in South Africa
Basketball leagues in Africa
Professional sports leagues in South Africa